Andrew Jones (born October 29, 1982) is a Canadian retired professional football player who was an offensive lineman for the BC Lions of the Canadian Football League (CFL). Jones was drafted by the Lions in the fourth round of the 2007 CFL Draft. He is a three-time Grey Cup champion, having won with three different teams in a span of five years, 2011, 2012, and 2015. He played CIS football for the McMaster Marauders.

Professional career
Jones was drafted as a defensive lineman (his position with McMaster) by the BC Lions 32nd overall in the 2007 CFL Draft. He spent 2007 on the practice roster and all of 2008 injured, but became more of a mainstay in 2009 as he went on to play in 36 games over three seasons with the Lions. After winning his first Grey Cup in 2011, he was then signed by the Toronto Argonauts as a free agent on March 2, 2012. He won another Grey Cup with Toronto and spent two seasons in total there until he signed with the Edmonton Eskimos, also as a free agent, on February 11, 2014. He spent the 2016 season with the Saskatchewan Roughriders and remained out of football until he was signed the following year by the Lions again on August 8, 2017.

References

External links
BC Lions bio
Saskatchewan Roughriders bio 
Edmonton Eskimos bio
Toronto Argonauts bio 

1982 births
Living people
BC Lions players
Canadian football offensive linemen
Edmonton Elks players
McMaster Marauders football players
Players of Canadian football from Ontario
Canadian football people from Toronto
Saskatchewan Roughriders players
Toronto Argonauts players